Estonian Road Museum is a museum in Põlva County, Varbuse, Estonia. The museum is owned by Estonian Road Administration, which is a subunit of Ministry of Economic Affairs and Communications. The purpose of the museum is to collect, preserve, interpret, and exhibit items related to Estonian roads, road buildings and traffic heritage.

The museum was opened on 6 June 2005.

In total, the museum contains about 43,000 items. The museum has also the biggest road grader collection in Eastern Europe.

In summer 2019 the exhibition hall (1,500 m2) was opened, and amongst other things the hall exhibits collection of road construction machinery until 1985.

References

External links

 

Museums in Estonia
Kanepi Parish